Hoots Milling Company Roller Mill, also known as Charles A. Bunn Company Office and Warehouse, is a historic roller mill and warehouse located at Winston-Salem, Forsyth County, North Carolina.  The mill was built about 1935, and is a two-story heavy timber and frame building, with an attached two-story heavy timber and frame warehouse built about 1937. A one-story, metal-sided, front-gable-roofed, warehouse was built in the 1930s. A one-story warehouse added in the 1950s connected the two buildings. The mill incorporates a gabled grain elevator.

It was listed on the National Register of Historic Places in 2014.

References

Grinding mills in North Carolina
Grinding mills on the National Register of Historic Places in North Carolina
Industrial buildings completed in 1937
Buildings and structures in Winston-Salem, North Carolina
National Register of Historic Places in Winston-Salem, North Carolina